The Idaho Vandals are the college football team that represents the University of Idaho and plays its home games at the Kibbie Dome, an indoor facility on campus in Moscow, Idaho. Idaho is a member of the Big Sky Conference in the Football Championship Subdivision (FCS). The new head coach in 2022 is Jason Eck, who succeeded Paul Petrino (2013–2021).

The Idaho football program began  in 1893, and through the 2019 season, the Vandals have an all-time record of  They have played in three bowl games in their history, all victories in the Humanitarian/Famous Idaho Potato Bowl in Boise in 1998, 2009 and 2016. As a Division I-AA (FCS) program for   Idaho made the playoffs 11 times and advanced to the national semifinals twice (1988 and 1993).

On April 28, 2016, university president Chuck Staben announced the football program would return to the Big Sky and FCS in 2018. This followed the Sun Belt Conference's announcement on March 1 that the associate membership of Idaho and New Mexico State for football would end after the  Idaho is the first FBS program to voluntarily drop

History

The University of Idaho fielded its first football team in 1893. It wasn't until 1917 that the program earned its nickname, the Vandals, after the UI basketball team under alumnus Hec Edmundson played defense with such ferocity that they "vandalized" their opponents and, thus, the nickname of Vandals was adopted for all school sports.

Conference affiliations
The Idaho football program began competing  in 1893, and was a member of the Pacific Coast Conference from 1922 to 1958. It was then an independent until 1965, when it began league play in the Big Sky Conference. At the time, the other four football programs in the conference were members of the College Division (today's Division II), while Idaho remained a member of the University Division (today's Division I) through 1977, except for an involuntary demotion for 1967 and 1968. It maintained its status by playing a majority of games against University Division opponents.

A charter member of the Big Sky in 1963, Idaho did not participate in league play for football until 1965, the Big Sky's third year, after the conference demanded it. With its upper division status, the Vandals were ineligible for the College Division (D-II) playoffs.  Notably, in 1971, the Vandals won their first outright conference title in school history.  However, runner-up Boise State received the Big Sky's automatic berth. Because of its hybrid status, Idaho requested to retain its higher allotment of football scholarships (75) than the other conference members (62), which was expectedly disallowed. The university received an invitation in 1973 to join the Pacific Coast Athletic Association (later the Big West Conference), but the state board of education (concurrent board of regents) rejected it by a vote of 4 to 3. The Big Sky moved up to the new Division I-AA in 1978 (while Idaho moved down).

Idaho experienced its best years in football from 1985 to 1995, when it made the I-AA national playoffs in ten of 11 seasons with four different head coaches, reaching the semifinals twice. After 18 years in Division I-AA, Idaho returned to Division I-A competition (now called the FBS) in 1996 in the Big West.

Idaho rejoined the Sun Belt Conference in 2014 after a season as an independent in 2013, and eight seasons in the Western Athletic Conference (WAC), which dropped football after the 2012 season.  The Vandals were previously in the Sun Belt (also football only) from 2001 through 2004, after the Big West dropped football.

On August 18, 2012, Idaho was cleared to stay in the Football Bowl Subdivision as an independent after the WAC announced it would drop football effective with the end of the 2012 season. Idaho would only remain a football independent for the 2013 season; on March 27 of that year, the Sun Belt Conference announced that Idaho would return as a football-only member starting with the 2014 season. Nearly two years later in 2016, the Sun Belt Conference announced via teleconference that neither the University of Idaho nor New Mexico State University would be renewed after the 2017 football season. In 2018, Idaho resumed full membership in the Big Sky Conference, which participates in the Football Championship Subdivision.

Conference championships
The Vandals have won 11 conference championships in their history, nine in the Big Sky.

 Co-champions

Division I-AA/FCS playoffs
For eighteen seasons (1978–95), Idaho was a member of Division I-AA, and in 2018 returned to complete in what is now called the FCS Subdivision. The Vandals have participated in the I-AA/FCS playoffs twelve times to compile a  playoff record.  The Vandals are 4–4 at home and 2–8 on the road, with a 4–8 record in the first round (2–4 at home, 2–4 away).

The best advancements were to the national semifinals in 1988 and 1993, but both seasons ended with road losses by large margins to the eventual national champions. The 1982 and 1990 teams advanced to the quarterfinals, but both lost close road games to the eventual national champions.

 I-AA Playoff field: 4 teams (1978–80), 8 teams (1981), 12 teams (1982–85), 16 teams (1986–2009)

Bowl games
In their time in the NCAA Division I Football Bowl Subdivision (FBS), Idaho participated in three bowl games, all in Boise. The Vandals had a 3–0 record.

Head coaches

^ Interim head coach – Gesser coached the final four games of 2012 after Akey was relieved on October 21.

Rivalries

Boise State
The University of Idaho formerly enjoyed an in-state rivalry with Boise State University. The Boise State – Idaho rivalry began with a Bronco victory in the first meeting in 1971. They met every year through 2010, and with the exception of four years, (2001–2004), the matchup was a conference game. The rivalry was dominated by streaks as Idaho won 12 straight years from 1982 to 1993, while Boise State won the most recent 12 games between 1999 and 2010, mostly by large margins. BSU leads the rivalry with a series record of 22–17–1. Since Boise State's move to the Mountain West Conference in 2011, Boise State has refused to play Idaho home-and-home in football. In response, Idaho has refused to play Boise State at ExtraMile Arena for men's basketball. As of 2017, no future games for football or men's basketball are scheduled. To add a humorous and somewhat frivolous twist to the rivalry in 2009, Idaho athletic director Rob Spear refused to board a Horizon Air flight on November 11, after learning the plane bore Boise State's blue and orange colors.

Idaho State
The University of Idaho enjoys another in-state rivalry with Idaho State University. Known as the Battle of the Domes, the rivalry was at its most competitive in the 1970s and 1980s, with neither team three-peating. Idaho's move into the Football Bowl Subdivision put the rivalry on hold for several years, the two schools only playing each other four times during Idaho's stay in the FBS. The series was revived in 2018 when Idaho dropped back to FCS and rejoined the Big Sky Conference in football (its other sports rejoined in 2014). 

The "Battle of the Domes" theme began in 2017, and is applied to multiple sports. Idaho State was the first of the pair to play its home games indoors, opening the Holt Arena (originally ASISU Minidome) in 1970. The Kibbie Dome in Moscow was enclosed in 1975, after four years as an outdoor venue; the last two outdoor games in this series were played there in 1971 and 1973,  then known as new Idaho Stadium.

Montana
The University of Idaho also enjoys a rivalry with the University of Montana. Known as the Little Brown Stein game, Idaho and Montana first played  in 1903 and have played 84 times, and the stein was introduced  in 1938, at the 25th meeting. Idaho has dominated the overall series , which also includes two Division I-AA playoff wins at home in the 1980s. Montana has had the upper hand since 1991, winning eight of the last ten. Since Idaho moved back up to Division I-A in 1996, the teams have met five times, with Montana winning the last four.

Both were members of the old Pacific Coast Conference (the forerunner of today's Pac-12); Montana departed after the 1949 season, and the PCC disbanded in the summer of 1959. The universities were charter members of the Big Sky Conference in 1963, (although Idaho remained an independent in football until 1965) and their final season as conference opponents was in 1995. While Montana has been in the Big Sky since its inception, Idaho has changed its conference affiliation no fewer than five times since 1995: Idaho moved to the Big West for all sports in 1996, returning to Division I-A after 18 years in I-AA. After the 2000 season, the Big West dropped football. Idaho became a football-only member of the Sun Belt Conference in 2001 while remaining a full Big West member. Idaho joined the WAC for all sports in 2005 as part of a major NCAA conference realignment. After the WAC experienced a near-complete membership turnover in the early 2010s, it dropped football after the 2012 season. Idaho football was an FBS independent for one season in 2013, then returned to the Big Sky in 2014 except for football, which rejoined the Sun Belt. Idaho will drop back to FCS in 2018 and resume football membership in the Big Sky.

Washington State
Known as the Battle of the Palouse, the first football game between the University of Idaho and Washington State University was played in November 1894 and resulted in a win for Washington State. The game in 1898 was not played because Idaho had an ineligible ringer from Lapwai, F.J. McFarland, a recent All-American from Carlisle. The Vandals' first-ever forward pass was attempted against the Cougars in 1907: it was completed for a touchdown from a drop-kick formation in the fourth quarter and led to a 5–4 victory.

Washington State has dominated the local rivalry, holding a  lead. The record since 1926 is even more dominant, with a  advantage for the Cougars. The longest winning streak for Idaho was three games (1923–1925), and has only five victories since that three-peat (1954, 1964, 1965, 1999, & 2000) and two ties (1927, 1950) to offset the 56 losses. The games were skipped in 1969 and 1971, which was unfortunate for Idaho as the 1971 Vandals posted one of the best records (8–3) in school history, while WSU was 4–7. The rivalry became increasingly one-sided as WSU dominated in the 1970s (except for 1974) and the original series ended, following the 1978 game. From 1979 to 1997, the game was played just twice (1982, and 1989) until the 10-year renewal from 1998 to 2007. Since their last wins in 1999 and 2000, Idaho has been physically outmatched in most of the nine games; the game has been played twice since 2007: in 2013 and 2016.

As two schools are in close proximity, from 1938 to 1968 there was a tradition called The Loser's Walk, where during the week following the game students of the losing school would walk from their own campus to the winners' campus, then receive rides back home from the winning side. This has frequently been misreported as students walking back to their own campus immediately following the game. In 1954, the walk made national news when about 2,000 students from Washington State College made the trek east from Pullman to Moscow after the Cougars lost to Idaho for the first time in 29 years.

In a span of less than five months, from November 1969 to April 1970, both schools' aged wooden stadiums (Idaho's Neale Stadium and WSU's Rogers Field) burned down due to suspected arson. The WSU–Idaho game in 1970 was dubbed the Displaced Bowl, which was held in Joe Albi Stadium in Spokane on September 19. The Cougars won the game (their only win that season), as well as the next ten against the Vandals. The 1970 game was the first in the rivalry played on AstroTurf, which was new to Joe Albi that season. In 1978, the NCAA split Division I football in two: I-A (now FBS) and I-AA (now FCS). Washington State was in Division I-A as part of the Pac-10 Conference and Idaho downgraded to I-AA as part of the Big Sky Conference, whose other football members moved up from Division II. In the late 1970s, I-A football programs were allowed 50% more scholarships and twice as many assistant coaches as I-AA teams. During the years they were in different divisions, the schools met only twice, 1982 in Spokane and 1989 in Pullman. In 1996, Idaho moved back up to Division I-A in the Big West Conference, and Idaho and WSU rekindled their century-old rivalry. Since the rivalry was reinstated in 1998, every game has been played at Martin Stadium in Pullman, except for the matchup in 2003, which was played at Seattle's Seahawks Stadium. The last game played on the Idaho side of the border was in 1966, a come-from-behind 14–7 Cougar victory on a very muddy field to prevent a Vandal three-peat.

After ten years of the renewed rivalry, Vandals head coach Robb Akey, previously WSU's defensive coordinator, said in 2008 that he preferred the game not be played every year, instead saying he would prefer it as a "once-in-a-while thing." Only one game was played during Akey's tenure, in his first season in 2007, and he was fired in October 2012. The meeting in 2013 on September 21 was a one-year revival, but the future of the series under Vandal head coach Paul Petrino is unclear; WSU won 56–6 in 2016.

College Football Hall of Fame

Erickson began his head-coaching career at Idaho from 1982-85, where he became the first coach since 1938 to post consecutive winning seasons at the school and the first coach in Vandals history to have four-consecutive winning seasons. Erickson led Idaho to the Big Sky Conference title in 1985 and two trips to the FCS Playoffs.

National Award Winners

Walter Payton Award

The Walter Payton Award is awarded annually to the most outstanding offensive player in the NCAA Division I Football Championship Subdivision (formerly Division I-AA) of college football.

All Americans

Notable players

NFL
Jesse Davis – guard for the Miami Dolphins (2017–21) and Minnesota Vikings (2022–present)
 John Friesz – quarterback in the College Football Hall of Fame, 1989 Walter Payton Award, NFL (1990–2000)
 Mike Iupati – consensus All-American guard, 17th overall pick in 2010 NFL Draft, (2010–20); San Francisco 49ers, Arizona Cardinals, Seattle Seahawks
 Jerry Kramer – five-time All-Pro guard (five NFL & two Super Bowl titles) with the Green Bay Packers (1958–68); author and Pro Football Hall of Famer (2018)
 Benson Mayowa – defensive end for the Arizona Cardinals (2018), Dallas Cowboys (2016-17), Oakland Raiders (2014–15, 2019), Seattle Seahawks (2013, 2020-21), including Super Bowl XLVIII.
 Ray McDonald – 13th overall pick in 1967 draft, running back for the Washington Redskins, 1967–68.
 Jim Norton – safety, all-time AFL interceptions leader, first number retired (#43) by the Houston Oilers (1960–68)
 Jeff Robinson – 1993–2009, Denver Broncos, Rams, Cowboys, Rams, Seahawks.  Super Bowl Champion in Super Bowl XXXIV (Rams).
 Mark Schlereth – two-time Pro Bowl guard, three Super Bowl titles with the Washington Redskins and Denver Broncos (1989–2000)
 Jake Scott – guard for the Philadelphia Eagles (2012), Tennessee Titans (2008–11), Indianapolis Colts (2004–07), including Super Bowl XLI.
 Wee Willie Smith – New York Giants (1934 NFL Champions)
 Korey Toomer – linebacker (2012–18): Seattle Seahawks, Oakland Raiders, San Francisco 49ers
 David Vobora – Mr. Irrelevant of the 2008 NFL Draft, linebacker with the Seattle Seahawks
 Wayne Walker – All-Pro linebacker with the Detroit Lions (1958–72), started 200 games; sportscaster
 Marvin Washington – defensive end (1989–1999) for Jets, 49ers, Broncos.  Super Bowl Champion  (XXXIII, Broncos).
 John Yarno – first of two All-Americans from Idaho at FBS level, five-year starter at center for the Seattle Seahawks (1978–82)

CFL
 Brian Allen – Wide receiver, Edmonton Eskimos (1984)
 Jerry Campbell – LB, (1966–75), inducted into Canadian Football Hall of Fame in 1996
 Ken Hobart –  Quarterback (QB), USFL (1984–85), CFL (1985–90), winner of Jeff Russel Memorial Trophy in 1985
 Craig Juntunen –  QB, (1978–79)
 Rolly Lumbala – Fullback, BC Lions (2008–present)
 Aaron Grymes –  Defensive back, (2013–present)

Coaches
(former Vandal football players coaching in either college or professional football)

Steve Belko
Steve Buratto
Tom Cable
Tony Knap
Mike Kramer
Scott Linehan
Don Matthews
Doug Nussmeier
Bud Riley
Lyle Smith
Chris Tormey

Other
 Anthony Curcio, author, public speaker, and former career criminal
 Dennis Eichhorn, writer
 Bill Fagerbakke, actor
 Dan Monson, college basketball coach

Retired numbers

Top NFL Draft selections

Future non-conference opponents
Announced schedules as of July 10, 2022.

See also

References

External links
 

 
American football teams established in 1893
1893 establishments in Idaho